Melito of Sardis (died c. 180) was a Christian apologist and saint.

Melito may also refer to the following places in Italy:

Melito (river), an Italian river that empties into the Ionian Sea
Melito di Napoli, a municipality of the Province of Naples, Campania
Melito di Porto Salvo, a municipality of the Province of Reggio Calabria, Calabria
Melito Irpino, a municipality of the Province of Avellino, Campania
Melito (Prignano Cilento), a hamlet of Prignano Cilento, Campania
Melito's canon, the biblical canon attributed to Melito of Sardis

See also
 Melita (disambiguation)
 Melite, spouse of Euripides
 Meliti, a village in the Florina regional unit, Greece
 Miletus, an ancient Greek city on the western coast of Anatolia